WRAZ (channel 50), branded on-air as Fox 50, is a television station licensed to Raleigh, North Carolina, United States, serving as the Fox affiliate for the Research Triangle area. It is locally owned by the Capitol Broadcasting Company alongside NBC affiliate and company flagship WRAL-TV (channel 5, also licensed to Raleigh) and Class A Decades affiliate WNGT-CD (channel 34, licensed to both Smithfield and Selma). The stations share studios at Capitol Broadcasting headquarters on Western Boulevard in Raleigh, while WRAZ's transmitter is located near Auburn, North Carolina.

History
A construction permit to build a television station in Raleigh on UHF channel 50 was originally owned by The Reverend James Layton's Tar Heel Broadcasting. Layton entered the under-construction station, originally known as WACN, into a local marketing agreement (LMA) with the Capitol Broadcasting Company, under which the station would be run out of WRAL's studios with transmission facilities on the WRAL tower near Auburn.

On September 7, 1995, the station signed on as WRAZ (a variation of WRAL), taking over the WB affiliation after WNCN in Goldsboro switched to NBC. A subsequent rebranding occurred in 1996 to "WB 50" to reflect the network affiliation; later that year, Fox announced that it would not renew its contract with Raleigh's WLFL (channel 22) when the network got involved in a dispute with the station's owner, Sinclair Broadcast Group, over prime time newscast slots. Even though the network later relented, it still managed to seek a new affiliation with WRAZ leaving WLFL to pick up programming from The WB once its affiliation contract with Fox expired on August 1, 1998. Following the affiliation switch, reality and talk shows as well as first-run court shows were added to the lineup and cartoons were cut to Weekday afternoons and Saturday mornings. The last WB program to air on WRAZ was a repeat airing of The Steve Harvey Show episode "Fool and the Gang" on July 29, 1998 at 9:30 p.m., but three days later, the first Fox program to air on WRAZ was Ned's Newt at 8:00 a.m. on August 1, 1998.

In 1998, WRAZ's main offices and master control relocated to the Diamond View office building in Downtown Durham next door to the Durham Bulls Athletic Park and the American Tobacco complex. Capitol Broadcasting would buy WRAZ outright from Tar Heel Broadcasting in 2000. In most markets, such a duopoly would not have been allowed under Federal Communications Commission (FCC) rules which forbid one company from owning two of the four largest stations in a single market. However, WRAZ, as the Triangle's newest major station, was sixth in the ratings at the time. For this reason, the FCC allowed the sale. Unlike most new duopoly partners that start sharing the same studios elsewhere, its studios remained in Durham at the time. To this day, it is the largest Fox affiliate owned in a duopoly with a "Big Three" station.

In August 2012, WRAZ's master control merged with WRAL's in Raleigh. The office staff moved back to Raleigh over the next month.

Programming

Preemptions of controversial Fox programming
Capitol Broadcasting Company has had a history of preempting some Fox programming on WRAZ it deemed too risky or controversial. It was one of the few stations in the United States to refuse to air portions of Fox reality shows Temptation Island and Who Wants to Marry a Multi-Millionaire? Capitol viewed the programs as anti-family. Instead, the station showed reruns of other shows including classic off-network sitcoms such as Cheers, The Andy Griffith Show and Seinfeld. It used the same approach in 2003 by refusing to air additional episodes of Married by America claiming that the content of the show was demeaning to the institution of marriage (the preemptions of that series turned out to be a blessing for Capitol, as WRAZ didn't air an episode that ended up earning Fox and its stations FCC attention, along with a later-reduced fine, for its content). This also happened with Who's Your Daddy? in 2005, when WRAZ cited its treatment of adoption.

It was also one of a handful of Fox affiliates who initially declined to broadcast the controversial, two-part interview special on O. J. Simpson, If I Did It, Here's How It Happened. It was set to air on November 27 and 29, 2006, before the network pulled the program before its broadcast (WRAZ would air the 2018 re-edit of the special in a form which was more critical of Simpson). WRAZ was also among a handful of stations that either delayed or refused to air the series premiere of Osbournes: Reloaded on March 31, 2009. In the station's case, the show aired at 11:35 p.m., replacing an episode of Seinfeld that had been moved to the spot immediately after American Idol.

Past American Idol history
During Season 5 of Fox's mega-hit American Idol, WRAZ was consistently one of the network's top-rated stations. While the national Nielsen ratings for February 28, 2006 were 17.0 with a 25% share of overall households tuning in, the station registered a 21.7 rating (equivalent to 213,788 households in the market) and a 31% share. Those numbers were roughly 28% higher than the national average. Part of the show's high ratings numbers in North Carolina are tied to the past success of artists such as Season 2 runner-up Clay Aiken (who is from Raleigh) and Season 3 champion Fantasia Barrino (of High Point). Season 5 had three finalists hailing from North Carolina: Chris Daughtry (McLeansville) who finished fourth, Kellie Pickler (Albemarle) who finished sixth, and Bucky Covington (Rockingham) who finished eighth.

Use for WRAL overflow
Since WRAL operates in a duopoly with WRAZ, the station also broadcasts NBC (formerly CBS until February 29, 2016 when WRAL swapped affiliations with WNCN) programming in certain cases when WRAL is unable to do so (such as during special events, or extended breaking news or severe weather coverage). For example, WRAZ aired CBS' coverage of the Duke/Saint Louis college basketball game on December 11, 2010 so WRAL could offer live coverage of Elizabeth Edwards' funeral.

Current station programming
Syndicated programming on WRAZ includes Family Feud, The Wendy Williams Show, Judge Jerry, Access Hollywood, Two and a Half Men, Schitt's Creek and Right This Minute.

Newscasts

Concurrently with its 1995 sign-on, WRAZ began airing a nightly prime time newscast at 10, produced by WRAL through a news share agreement. This half-hour show was originally a repurposed WRAL newscast and competed with WLFL's longer-established hour-long broadcast also seen every night. That station already had a firmly established operation in the market by this time and it remained strong in the ratings with a popular on-air team. After the affiliation switch on August 1, 1998, WRAZ's newscast became known as Fox 50 Ten O'Clock News. On January 28, 2001, WRAL became the first Triangle station to begin broadcasting its local newscasts in high definition.

However, the shows on WRAZ were not initially included in the change. When the evening newscast was rebranded as WRAL News at 10 on Fox 50 a few years later, the program was finally upgraded to HD. On August 16, 2004, WLFL's news department was downsized and converted into Sinclair's controversial News Central operation. A further reduction occurred at that station in September 2005, when its broadcast was cut down to thirty minutes in an attempt to boost its now anemic ratings against WRAZ. On June 26, 2006, after shuttering its in-house operation, WLFL entered into a news share agreement with ABC's owned-and-operated station WTVD. To be more competitive, WRAZ eventually expanded their 10:00 p.m. newscast to one hour, and on January 12, 2015, began a late afternoon newscast at 4:00 p.m. That newscast moved to WRAL on February 29, replacing The Young and the Restless which was also moved with the rest of CBS' schedule to WNCN.

WRAZ airs WRAL's weekday morning show from 4:30 to 7 a.m. along with their news on Fox 50 from 7 to 10 a.m. with all newscasts originating from WRAL's facility on Western Boulevard in Raleigh. The station usually simulcasts WRAL-TV during local breaking news coverage.

Technical information

Subchannels
The station's digital signal is multiplexed:

On September 10, 2007, the station added the Retro Television Network (RTV) to its second digital subchannel which also aired live Durham Bulls home games. MeTV replaced RTV in 2011. At one point in time, WRAL operated a 24-hour local weather channel on WRAZ's third digital subchannel called "WRAL Weather Center Channel". It was also carried on Time Warner Cable channel 252. It switched to This TV on March 30, 2009. At some point, WRAZ-DT3 became a standard definition simulcast of its main feed and moved to digital cable channel 150, after which it was removed. On September 9, 2019, the third subchannel was reactivated, carrying the debut of the Dabl lifestyle channel. In January 2022, the fourth subchannel was activated, carrying Heroes & Icons.

Analog-to-digital conversion
Along with WRAL, WRAZ began digital broadcasting in late 2000 from a transmission tower near Garner. WRAZ discontinued regular programming on its analog signal, over UHF channel 50, at 1 p.m. on June 12, 2009, the official date in which full-power television stations in the United States transitioned from analog to digital broadcasts under federal mandate. The station's digital signal continued to broadcasts on its pre-transition UHF channel 49. Through the use of PSIP, digital television receivers display the station's virtual channel as its former UHF analog channel 50.

Out-of-market cable coverage
In recent years, WRAZ has been carried on cable in multiple areas within the Greensboro and Greenville media markets in North Carolina.

References

External links
WRAZ schedule page on wral.com

Television channels and stations established in 1993
1993 establishments in North Carolina
RAZ (TV)
Capitol Broadcasting Company
Fox network affiliates
MeTV affiliates
Dabl affiliates
Heroes & Icons affiliates
National Hockey League over-the-air television broadcasters